Kristian Krogh Johannessen (born 3 March 1995) is a Norwegian professional golfer who has played on the European Tour and the Challenge Tour. He played in the 2020 Summer Olympics and won the 2022 Italian Challenge Open.

Amateur career
Johannessen played for the national team and represented Norway at the 2012 Eisenhower Trophy with Anders Engell and Kristoffer Ventura, where they finished sixth. He also played on the winning side in the 2010 Jacques Léglise Trophy, where Continental Europe won. He played in the European Boys' Team Championship three times and won silver in 2010, after he was beaten by Thomas Pieters of Belgium by 3 to 2 in the final.

He had his international breakthrough at 19 during the qualification for the 2014 Open Championship, where he lowered the course record at Bruntsfield Links near Edinburgh by four strokes, from 67 to 63 (eight under par).

In January 2015 Johannessen was slated to move to the U.S. to play college golf with the Tennessee Volunteers men's golf team at University of Tennessee, but decided to turn professional.

Professional career
Johannessen joined the 2015 Nordic Golf League, where he secured his first professional victory at the 2015 Holtsmark Open on home soil, following a playoff with Petter Bocian of Sweden. He finished the season fourth in the order of merit to earn promotion to the Challenge Tour. On the Challenge Tour he was runner-up at the 2018 Swiss Challenge behind Marcel Schneider, and again at the 2020 Northern Ireland Open, two strokes behind American Tyler Koivisto. At the 2021 D+D Real Czech Challenge he lost a three-way playoff to Santiago Tarrío of Spain for his third runner-up finish.

He was one of the 27 players who earned 2019 European Tour cards through Q School in 2018. He represented Norway at the 2018 European Golf Team Championships. 

In June 2021 he qualified for the 2020 Summer Olympics in Tokyo together with Viktor Hovland, just ahead of Kristoffer Ventura, thanks to the runner-up finish at the Czech Challenge which earned him 6 OWGR points and a career-high world rank of 289.

Amateur wins
2011 Canadian International Junior Challenge
2012 Norgesmesterskapet Junior (Titleist Tour), Titleist Tour 7
2013 Team Norway Junior Tour Finale
2014 Titleist Tour 6

Source:

Professional wins (5)

Challenge Tour wins (1)

Challenge Tour playoff record (1–1)

Nordic Golf League wins (3)

Other wins (1)
2020 Norwegian National Golf Championship

Team appearances
Amateur
Jacques Léglise Trophy (representing Continental Europe): 2010 (winners)
European Boys' Team Championship (representing Norway): 2010, 2011, 2012, 2013
Eisenhower Trophy (representing Norway): 2012, 2014

Professional
European Championships (representing Norway): 2018

See also
2018 European Tour Qualifying School graduates
2022 Challenge Tour graduates

References

External links
 
 
 
 

Norwegian male golfers
European Tour golfers
Olympic golfers of Norway
Golfers at the 2020 Summer Olympics
Sportspeople from Drammen
1995 births
Living people